The Journal of Pharmacy Practice is a bimonthly peer-reviewed healthcare journal that covers the field of pharmacy, including  new drugs and therapies, pharmacokinetics, drug administration, and adverse drug reactions. The editor-in-chief is Henry Cohen (Long Island University). It was established in 1988 and is currently published by SAGE Publications.

Abstracting and indexing 
The Journal of Pharmacy Practice is abstracted and indexed in:
 Academic Complete
 Academic Premier
 CINAHL
 Clin-Alert
 MEDLINE
 PsycINFO
 Scopus

External links 
 

SAGE Publishing academic journals
English-language journals
Pharmacology journals
Bimonthly journals
Publications established in 1988